Michael Audreson (born 1 August 1956) is a British actor who appeared in films and television shows in the 1960s. He was in the 12-episode Children's Film Foundation series The Magnificent Six and a Half before playing the bespectacled "Brains" in Here Come the Double Deckers (1970–71). In the film Young Winston (1971) he played Winston Churchill as a schoolboy.

As the 1970s progressed, Audreson had a role in two episodes of The Tomorrow People (1978) television series.

Audreson wrote and directed two short films: The Man Who Could Read Minds (1999) and Eve Buckingham (2001) starring Susan Hampshire. His feature film The 10 Arenas of Marwood (2010), which he wrote and directed, starred Judi Bowker, John Hasler, Kate G. Laycy, Michael Mayne, Bryan Murray, Lucy Russell, Issy Van Randwyck, Emma Williams and Peter Wickham as Marwood.

He has founded a media production and distribution company, 10am Media.

References

External links 
 

1956 births
Living people
English male child actors
English male film actors
English male television actors